Kate Shortman (born 19 November 2001) is a British synchronised swimmer. She competed in the women's duet event at the 2020 Summer Olympics held in Tokyo, Japan. She also represented Great Britain at the 2017 World Aquatics Championships in Budapest, Hungary and at the 2019 World Aquatics Championships in Gwangju, South Korea. She also competed at the 2022 World Aquatics Championships in Budapest, Hungary. She trains at the City of Bristol Swimming Club.

At the 2019 World Aquatics Championships, she finished in 10th place in the solo technical routine and in 11th place in the solo free routine. Shortman and Isabelle Thorpe competed in the duet technical routine and duet free routine and they finished in 14th place in the preliminary round in both events.

In 2021, she competed in the solo free routine, the duet free routine and duet technical routine events at the 2020 European Aquatics Championships held in Budapest, Hungary.

She finished in 7th place in the solo technical routine at the 2022 World Aquatics Championships held in Budapest, Hungary. Shortman and Isabelle Thorpe finished in 9th place in the duet technical routine.

References

External links
 
 

2001 births
Living people
Sportspeople from Bristol
British synchronised swimmers
Synchronized swimmers at the 2017 World Aquatics Championships
Artistic swimmers at the 2019 World Aquatics Championships
Artistic swimmers at the 2022 World Aquatics Championships
Synchronized swimmers at the 2020 Summer Olympics
Olympic synchronised swimmers of Great Britain
21st-century British women